Benedictus Hubertus Danser (May 24, 1891, Schiedam – October 18, 1943, Groningen), often abbreviated B. H. Danser, was a Dutch taxonomist and botanist. Danser specialised in the plant families Loranthaceae, Nepenthaceae, and Polygonaceae.

In 1928, Danser published an exhaustive revision of the genus Nepenthes, recognising 65 species in "The Nepenthaceae of the Netherlands Indies". While nowadays more than 140 species of Nepenthes are known, Danser's work is still referenced by specialists in the field.

Danser died in Groningen on October 18, 1943. The genus Dansera (Fabaceae) and the species Nepenthes danseri (Nepenthaceae), Rumex danseri (Polygonaceae) and Taxillus danseriana (Loranthaceae) are named after him.

See also
:Category:Taxa named by Benedictus Hubertus Danser

References 

 Jansen, P. & W.H. Wachter 1943. In memoriam Benedictus Hubertus Danser. Nederlandsch Kruidkundig Archief 53: 129–132, 133–136.

1891 births
1943 deaths
20th-century Dutch botanists
Dutch taxonomists
People from Schiedam